Sean Murphy-Bunting (formerly Bunting, born June 19, 1997) is an American football cornerback who is a free agent of the National Football League (NFL). He played college football at Central Michigan.

Early years
Murphy-Bunting attended and played high school football at Chippewa Valley High School.

College career
Murphy-Bunting played three seasons for the Chippewas, starting his sophomore and junior seasons. As a sophomore, he recorded five interceptions, which finished second in the Mid-American Conference. As a junior, Murphy-Bunting recorded 37 tackles and two interceptions and was named first team All-Mid-American Conference (MAC). He decided to forgo his final year of eligibility to enter the 2019 NFL Draft.

Professional career

Tampa Bay Buccaneers
Murphy-Bunting was selected by the Tampa Bay Buccaneers in the second round with the 39th overall pick in the 2019 NFL Draft.

2019 season
In Week 5 against the New Orleans Saints, Murphy-Bunting recorded his first career interception off Teddy Bridgewater in the 31–24 loss. In Week 13, during a 28–11 win against the Jacksonville Jaguars, Murphy-Bunting recorded a critical fourth quarter interception off of fellow rookie Gardner Minshew in the Buccaneers's end zone to prevent a potential score. In Week 15, during a 38–17 win against the Detroit Lions, Murphy-Bunting had a team-leading eight tackles, one pass deflection, and an interception off of fellow rookie David Blough which he returned 70 yards for his first career touchdown.
In Week 16, during a 23–20 loss to the Houston Texans, Murphy-Bunting had four tackles, one pass deflection, and his first career sack on Deshaun Watson which resulted in a fumble.

Murphy-Bunting finished his rookie season with 44 tackles, one sack, eight pass deflections, three interceptions, one interception return touchdown, and one forced fumble.

2020 season

In Week 8 against the New York Giants on Monday Night Football, Murphy–Bunting recorded his first interception of the season off a pass thrown by Daniel Jones during the 25–23 win. Overall, he finished the 2020 season with 70 total tackles, one interception, two passes defended, one fumble, and one fumble recovery in 16 games.

In the Wild Card Round of the playoffs against the Washington Football Team, Murphy-Bunting intercepted a pass thrown by Taylor Heinicke during the 31–23 win.
In the Divisional Round against the New Orleans Saints, Murphy-Bunting intercepted a pass thrown by Drew Brees during the 30–20 win. In the NFC Championship against the Green Bay Packers, Murphy-Bunting recorded six total tackles, a pass deflection, and intercepted a pass thrown by Aaron Rodgers as the Buccaneers defeated the Packers 31–26 to advance to Super Bowl LV, where they defeated the Kansas City Chiefs 31–9, to give Murphy-Bunting his first Super Bowl championship.
With this playoff run, Murphy-Bunting became the first player with an interception in each of his first three career playoff games since Hall of Famer Ed Reed.

2021 season
On September 13, 2021, Murphy-Bunting was placed on injured reserve after suffering a dislocated elbow in the first quarter of a 31-29 win over the Dallas Cowboys in the opener. He was activated on November 22.

NFL career statistics

Regular season

Postseason

References

External links
 Tampa Bay Buccaneers bio
 Central Michigan Chippewas bio
 

1997 births
Living people
African-American players of American football
American football cornerbacks
Central Michigan Chippewas football players
Players of American football from Michigan
People from Macomb County, Michigan
Sportspeople from Metro Detroit
Tampa Bay Buccaneers players
21st-century African-American sportspeople